Galdikas is a Lithuanian surname.

People with this surname include:

 Adomas Galdikas (born 1893), Lithuanian-American artist
 Birutė Galdikas (born 1946), Lithuanian-Canadian primatologist selected by Louis Leakey to study orangutans in Indonesia
 Felikso Galdikas, mother of Adomas Galdikas and Ona Galdikaitė
 Juozas Galdikas (born 1958), 1997 Lithuanian Minister of Health
 Ovidijus Galdikas (born 1988), Lithuanian basketball player
 Simas Galdikas (born 1987), Lithuanian basketball player

See also